The Islamic Cultural Center "Custodian of the Two Holy Mosques King Fahd in Argentina" ( or CCIAR) is a mosque and center for Islamic culture located in Buenos Aires, Argentina. It is named after King Fahd of Saudi Arabia.

It became the largest Mosque in Latin America, after the President Carlos Menem's 1995 grant of 34,000 m² of municipal land in the Palermo section of Buenos Aires was given to the Mosque, following a state visit to Saudi Arabia.

Inaugurated in 2000, the Mosque and cultural center, was constructed as a gift of the Saudi government on land donated by the Argentinian government.  It was designed by Saudi architect Zuhair Fayez, and includes prayer halls with capacities for 1,200 men and 400 women, respectively. The cultural center hosts a primary and secondary school, as well as a divinities school and a dormitory for 50 students.

Gallery

See also

 Islam in Argentina
 List of mosques in Argentina
 List of mosques
 List of mosques in the Americas
 List of things named after Saudi Kings

References

External links

 Official website
 Official website 

Mosques in Argentina
Buildings and structures in Buenos Aires
Religious buildings and structures in Buenos Aires
Mosques completed in 2000
2000 establishments in Argentina